Lake Khövsgöl
 Khövsgöl Province